Lassen is a Danish and Norwegian patronymic surname meaning "son of Lars" (equivalent of Laurentius), and thus a parallel form of the more common surname Larsen. Notable people with the surname include:

 Anders Lassen (1920–1945), a Danish recipient of the British Victoria Cross
 Christian Lassen, a Norwegian-German orientalist
 Clyde Everett Lassen, a United States Navy aviator and Medal of Honor recipient
 Eduard Lassen, a Belgian composer
 Erik Sætter-Lassen (1892–1966), a Danish sport shooter 
 Frederik Lassen, a Danish football player 
 Georg Lassen, a German former U-boat captain 
 Hans Christian Lassen, a Danish sprint canoer 
 Hartvig Lassen (1824–1897), a Norwegian editor and literary historian
 Henrik Andreas Zetlitz Lassen, a Norwegian politician
 Inger Lassen (1911–1957), a Danish film actress 
 Jean Elisabeth Lassen, a Canadian weightlifter 
 Justin Lassen, an American composer, producer, multi-instrumentalist and remixer
 Leigh Lassen, an American actress 
 Leo Lassen (1899–1975),an American baseball announcer 
 Niels A. Lassen (1926–1997), a Danish medical researcher
 Peter Lassen, a Danish-American rancher, prospector and explorer
 Peter Lassen (footballer), a Danish former football striker
 Werner Lassen, a Namibian amateur golfer

Lassen may also refer to Lassen Peak, located in Lassen Volcanic National Park, a national park in the United States.

See also
Larsen (disambiguation)
Larson (disambiguation)

Danish-language surnames
Norwegian-language surnames
Patronymic surnames